Yahav Gurfinkel (born 27 June 1998) is an Israeli professional footballer who plays as a defender.

Early life
Gurfinkel was born in moshav Amikam, Israel, to a family of Ashkenazi Jewish descent.

Club career
He made his Israeli Premier League debut for Maccabi Haifa on 21 January 2017 in a game against Ironi Kiryat Shmona.

On 31 May 2022, Gurfinkel's contract with IFK Norrköping was terminated by mutual consent.

References

External links

1998 births
Living people
Israeli footballers
Israeli Ashkenazi Jews
Footballers from Haifa District
Hapoel Nof HaGalil F.C. players
Maccabi Haifa F.C. players
Hapoel Hadera F.C. players
Hapoel Haifa F.C. players
IFK Norrköping players
Hapoel Tel Aviv F.C. players
Israeli Premier League players
Liga Leumit players
Allsvenskan players
Expatriate footballers in Sweden
Israeli expatriate sportspeople in Sweden
Israel under-21 international footballers
Association football defenders